Gymnocypris waddellii is a species of cyprinid fish endemic to Tibet.

Named in honor of Lieut.-Col. Laurence Austine Waddell, C.B. [Companion of the Order of the Bath] (1854-1938), British army surgeon, explorer, philologist, linguist, and chemistry and pathology professor, who preserved the type specimens in salt before presenting them to the British Museum (Natural History).

References 

waddellii
Cyprinid fish of Asia
Taxa named by Charles Tate Regan
Fish described in 1905